OAO Stroytransgaz is a Russian engineering construction company in the field of oil and gas industry. The company was founded in 1990. It was originally a subsidiary of Gazprom, but now controlled by Gennady Timchenko though his Volga Group SICAV SIF SA fund.
The company has been added to the Specially Designated Nationals List on the US Department of the Treasury site because of connections to the 2014 Crimean crisis.

Operations
The company is involved in the engineering and construction of pipeline systems, oil and gas production facilities, underground gas storages, power stations, as well as civil and industrial structures and facilities. In addition to Russia, the company is active in the CIS countries, in the Middle East, Turkey, India, Algeria, Germany and Greece. It is involved in the construction of the Arab Gas Pipeline, the Taweelah–Fujairah gas pipeline, and the Central Asia–China gas pipeline.

References

External links
 Company website

Engineering companies of Russia
Gazprom subsidiaries
Manufacturing companies of the Soviet Union
Companies based in Moscow
Russian companies established in 1990
Manufacturing companies established in 1990
Russian entities subject to the U.S. Department of the Treasury sanctions